Thomas Nyirenda (born January 28, 1986 in Zambia) is a Zambian football player who currently plays for Zanaco FC and for the Zambia national football team as a defender.

International career

He made his debut for the national side in 2009, playing for Zambia at the 2010 Africa Cup of Nations. He was the only player to miss from the spot in the quarter-final penalty shootout between his team and Nigeria, as Zambia lost the game and the qualification for the semi-finals.

References 

1984 births
Living people
Zambian footballers
2010 Africa Cup of Nations players
Association football defenders
Zanaco F.C. players
People from Chililabombwe District
Zambia international footballers